The Local Government Areas (Re-arrangement) Acts 1929 and 1931 were acts of the Parliament of South Australia. The application of the acts, via recommendations of the commission of the same name, led to the statewide re-arrangement of local government areas, effected from 1932 to 1935.

Rearrangements in 1932
Incomplete list:
 Beachport annexed most of Kennion effective 12 May
 Clare annexed part of Stanley
 New district Eudunda was created by the union of Julia and Neales effective 12 May
 Kanyaka annexed part of Woolundunga
 Kapunda annexed Belvidere, part of Gilbert and part of Hamilton effective 12 May
 New district Laura was created by the union of Booyoolie and Laura town effective 30 April
 Lucindale annexed part of Kennion effective 12 May
 New district Owen was created by the union of Alma Plains and Dalkey effective 12 May
 Port Augusta town annexed Davenport town Port Augusta West town and part of Woolundunga effective 28 April
 Port Elliot district annexed Port Elliot town and Goolwa town effective 12 May
 Port MacDonnell annexed part of Benara
 New district Riverton was created by the union of Rhynie, Stockport and most of Gilbert effective 12 May
 New district Robertstown was created by the union of Apoinga and English
 Saddleworth annexed Waterloo, most of Hamilton and part of Stanley effective 12 May
 Tantanoola annexed part of Benara and District of Mount Gambier West effective 23 May
 Willunga annexed Aldinga effective 12 May
 New district Yorketown was created by the union of Dalrymple, Melville and Yorketown town

Rearrangements in 1933
Incomplete list:
 Gawler town annexed Gawler South and a small part of Munno Para West effective 22 June
 Gladstone town annexed Gladstone district effective 15 May
 New district Keyneton and Swan Reach was created from the union of Keyneton and most of Swan Reach effective 18 September
 New district Munno Para was created from the union of Munno Para East and a large part of the Munno Para West effective 22 June
 New district Salisbury was created from the union of Yatala North and part of Munno Para West effective 22 June
 Truro annexed part of Swan Reach
 Waikerie annexed part of Swan Reach
 New district Wilmington was created by the union of Hammond, most of Woolundunga and part of Port Germein effective 16 February

Rearrangements in 1935
Incomplete list:
 Balaklava annexed part of Hall effective 1 May
 Barossa annexed Mount Crawford and a small part of Para Wirra effective 1 May
 Blyth annexed a large part of Hall and part of Hutt and Hill Rivers effective 1 May
 New district Burra Burra was created from the union of Burra, Hanson, Mount Bryan and a large part of Booborowie effective 1 May
 Clare annexed part of Hutt and Hill Rivers
 East Torrens annexed part of Crafers
 Eudunda annexed part of Robertstown effective 1 May
 New district Gumeracha was created from the union of Para Wirra and Talunga
 New district Jamestown was created from union of Caltowie, most of Belalie and part of Yongala
 Hallett annexed part of Booborowie and a small part of Belalie
 New district Light (soon renamed Mallala) was created from the union of Port Gawler, Dublin and Grace effective 1 May
 New district Marne was created from the union of Angas and Caurnamont effective 1 May
 New district Meadows was created from the union of most parts of Clarendon, Kondoparinga, Echunga, Macclesfield, a small part of Strathalbyn, and a small part of the Mount Barker effective 1 May
 Mobilong annexed Monarto, Brinkley, part of Mannum, and a small part of Onaunga effective 1 May
 Mount Barker annexed a large part of Nairne, part of Echunga and part of Macclesfield effective 1 May
 New district Mount Pleasant was created from the union of Tungkillo, Springton, a small part of Mannum and a small part of Mobilong effective 1 May
 Onkaparinga annexed part of Crafers
 New district Peterborough was created from the union of Coglin and most of Yongala
 Spalding annexed part of Hutt and Hill Rivers
 Stirling annexed most of Crafers effective 1 May
 Strathalbyn annexed Bremer, most of Onaunga, part of Brinkley, and part of Kondoparinga effective 1 May
 Tea Tree Gully annexed Highercombe and a small part of Para Wirra effective 1 May
 Terowie annexed part of Booborowie
 Tumby Bay annexed part of Cleve effective 1 May

See also
 District Councils Act 1887

References

South Australia legislation
Local government in South Australia
Local government legislation in Australia